The AFBN's Eredivisie (lit. "premier league") is the top division of American football in the Netherlands founded in 1983. The league currently consists of 8 teams from different cities of the Netherlands. At the end of each regular season, the top two teams from each "pool" play in the playoffs, a four-team single-elimination tournament that culminates with the championship game, known as the Tulip Bowl.

2021/2022 season lineup

Promotion/Relegation
At the end of the regular season, the worst-performing team from this division will play a match against the best-performing team from "First division". The winner of that match will play in Eredivise next season; the loser will play in Erste divisie.

References

External links
Official website of the AFBN (in Dutch)
AFBN scores and standings

 

American football in the Netherlands
2001 establishments in the Netherlands
Sports leagues established in 2001